Sascha Grabow (born 15 January 1968) is a German adventurer and mountaineer. > He visited every country in the world between 1987 and 2016, and walked through both the smaller and greater Congo. Sascha Grabow in August 2021 reached world provinces' pole position as defined by both SISO and CHAD. Sascha also leads two further international travel rankings, TEC and RDW.

Early life
Grabow was born in Wolfsburg, Lower Saxony. His father taught English and history while his mother was an aquarelle painter. He spent his childhood in Waiblingen, Baden-Württemberg, attended primary school in Untergruppenbach and high school at the Herzog-Christoph-Gymnasium in Beilstein.
 
Grabow operates a website called greatestglobetrotters.com which invites people to register their own travel histories.

See also
 List of travelers
 List of explorers
 Perpetual traveler
 Global nomad
 Hitchhiker

References

 Sources
 Interview with Sascha Grabow & other Extreme Travelers. Lead photo: Sascha Grabow Spiegel Magazine International Edition, April 15, 2011
 Sascha Grabow: Around the World in 29 Years, LonelyPlanet, May 15, 2015
 Sascha Grabow, Germany’s Most Traveled Man, December 10, 2012
 National Geographic Photographer Grabow, August 1, 2013
Around the World with Sascha, August 20, 2012
 World Travel Map Grabow, December 21, 2018
Seven Summits Climbed, July 5, 2020

 

German travel writers
1968 births
Living people
People from Wolfsburg
Photographers from Lower Saxony
German male non-fiction writers
German tennis coaches
20th-century explorers
21st-century explorers
German explorers
Explorers of Africa
German male tennis players